The following is a list of Livingston Award winners. The award is given for works published in the previous year.

References

External links
Livingston Award Winners

Livingston Award